The E.W. Copeland Trophy is an Australian rules football award given by the Collingwood Football Club to the player adjudged best and fairest for Collingwood during the year.

The Copeland Shield, as it was formerly known, was donated by Ern Copeland, the secretary who came to the club in 1895 and led the club through the 1890s depression, saving it from financial ruin. He remained an employee of Collingwood for 29 years, finally retiring in 1924. The trophy was unveiled in 1932, with the best and fairest award winners from the previous five years engraved on the trophy.

Along with the Copeland Trophy, the R.T. Rush Trophy is awarded to the second best and fairest player, the J.J. Joyce Trophy is awarded to the third placed player, the Jock McHale Trophy to the fourth placed player, and the Jack Regan Trophy to the fifth placed player.

The voting system as of the 2017 AFL season, consists of five coaches awarding 22 votes per match, with no specific distribution required. If two players are tied at the end of the season, the player with the highest average votes-per-game is awarded the winner. If they are still tied, the player with the highest number of 'high value' votes is awarded the winner.

Recipients

Multiple winners

Notes

 The Copeland Trophy was not awarded in the 1942, 1943, and 1944 VFL seasons because of World War II.

References
General

Specific

Australian Football League awards
Collingwood Football Club
Awards established in 1932
Australian rules football-related lists